The  (Hanseatics) is a collective term for the hierarchy group (so called First Families) consisting of elite individuals and families of prestigious rank who constituted the ruling class of the free imperial city of Hamburg, conjointly with the equal First Families of the free imperial cities of Bremen and Lübeck. The members of these First Families were the persons in possession of hereditary grand burghership of these cities, including the mayors, the senators, joint diplomats and the senior pastors.  refers specifically to the ruling families of Hamburg, Lübeck and Bremen, but more broadly, this group is also referred to as patricians along with similar social groups elsewhere in continental Europe.

Since the Congress of Vienna in 1815, the three cities have been officially named the "Free and Hanseatic City of Hamburg", the "Free Hanseatic City of Bremen" and the "Free and Hanseatic City of Lübeck", the latter being simply known since 1937 as the "Hanseatic City of Lübeck"..

Hamburg was one of the oldest stringent civic republics, in which the Hanseatics preserved their constitutional privileges, which were granted in 1189 by Frederick I, Holy Roman Emperor, until the German Revolution of 1918–19 and the Weimar Constitution. Hamburg was strictly republican, but it was not a democracy, but rather an oligarchy.

The Hanseaten were regarded as being of equal rank to the (landed) nobility elsewhere in Europe, although the Hanseaten often regarded the (rural) nobility outside the city republics as inferior to the (urban and often more affluent, and in their own view, cultivated) Hanseaten. Thomas Mann, a member of a Lübeck Hanseatic family, portrayed this class in his novel Buddenbrooks (1901), principally for which he received the 1929 Nobel Prize for Literature.

Relationship to the nobility

The relationship between the Hanseatic and noble families varied depending on the city. The most republican city was Hamburg, where the nobility was banned, from the 13th century to the 19th century, from owning property, participating in the political life of the city republic, and even from living within its walls. Hamburg, however, was not a true democracy, but rather an oligarchy, with the Hanseaten as its elite occupying the position held by noble and princely families elsewhere. According to Richard J. Evans, "the wealthy of nineteenth-century Hamburg were for the most part stern republicans, abhorring titles, refusing to accord any deference to the Prussian nobility, and determinedly loyal to their urban background and mercantile heritage." Many grand burghers considered the nobility inferior to Hanseatic families. A marriage between a daughter of a Hanseatic family and a noble was often undesired by the Hanseaten. From the late 19th century, being integrated into a German nation state, a number of Hanseatic families were nevertheless ennobled (by other German states, e.g. Prussia), but this was often met with criticism among their fellow Hanseaten. As the Hanseatic banker Johann von Berenberg-Gossler was ennobled in Prussia in 1889, his sister Susanne, married Amsinck, exclaimed " [But John, our good name!]" Upon hearing of the ennoblement of Rudolph Schröder (1852–1938) of the ancient Hanseatic Schröder family, Hamburg First Mayor Johann Heinrich Burchard remarked that the Prussian King could indeed "place" Schröder among the nobles, but he could not "elevate" a Hanseatic merchant.

Hanseatic rejection 
The long standing tradition that Hanseaten do not accept medals and honors "of foreign powers" is called the "hanseatic rejection". It is reflecting the spirit of unconditional independence, modesty and equality of the citizens of hanseatic cities. In an early version of the Hamburg constitution from 1270 it is written that "the fact that the externally visible insignia of the order should distinguish the decorated one from his colleagues and fellow citizens as a superior one" as a circumstance that was in decisive contradiction to the spirit of the city constitution. Politician Hans Koschnik (Bremen), former chancelor Helmut Schmidt (Hamburg) and several others people from Lübeck, Hamburg and Bremen refused the Order of the Federal Cross of Merit referring to the "hanseatic rejection". 

Bremen and Hamburg are also the only federal states that have not created their own orders of merit.

Hanseatic families
A few prominent families are listed here.

Abendroth
 Amandus Augustus Abendroth (1767–1842), mayor of Hamburg
 August Abendroth (1796–1876), lawyer
 Carl Eduard Abenroth (1804–1885), merchant, member of the Hamburg parliament

Albers
 Johann Christoph Albers (1741–1800), merchant representative of Bremen
 Johann Heinrich Albers (1775–1800), merchant of Bremen/London, art collector
 Anton Albers der Ältere (1765–1844), merchant of Bremen/Lausanne, painter

Amsinck

 Rudolf Amsinck (1577–1636), senator of Hamburg
 Wilhelm Amsinck (1752–1831), mayor of Hamburg

Berenberg, Goßler and Berenberg-Goßler

 Johann Hinrich Gossler (1738–1790), banker
 Johann Heinrich Gossler (1775–1842), senator and banker
 Anna Henriette Gossler (1771–1836), married to Ludwig Edwin Seyler
 Hermann Goßler (1802–1877), senator and First Mayor of Hamburg
 John von Berenberg-Gossler (1866–1943), Hamburg senator and banker
 Oskar Goßler (1875–1953), German sculler
 Gustav Goßler (1879–1940), German sculler

Burchard
 Johann Heinrich Burchard (1852–1912), mayor of Hamburg
 Johannes Leopold Burchard (1857–1925), Hamburg lawyer
 Wilhelm Amsinck Burchard-Motz (1878–1963), mayor of Hamburg

de Chapeaurouge
 Frédéric de Chapeaurouge (1813–1867), senator of Hamburg
 Charles Ami de Chapeaurouge (1830–1897), senator of Hamburg
 Paul de Chapeaurouge (1876–1952), senator of Hamburg
 Alfred de Chapeaurouge (1907–1993), German politician

Fehling
 Hermann von Fehling (1812–1885), German chemist
 Johann Fehling (1835–1893), Lübeck senator
 Emil Ferdinand Fehling (1847–1927), mayor of Lübeck, "Dr. Moritz Hagenström" in Buddenbrooks

Godeffroy
 Johann Cesar VI. Godeffroy (1813–1885), Hamburg merchant

Hudtwalcker
 Johann Michael Hudtwalcker (1747–1818), Hamburg merchant
 Martin Hieronymus Hudtwalcker (1787–1865) Hamburg senator
 Nicolaus Hudtwalcker (1794–1863), Hamburg insurance broker

Jauch

 Johann Christian Jauch senior (1765–1855), Hamburg merchant and Grand Burgher
 Auguste Jauch (1822–1902), Hamburg benefactor to the poor
 Carl Jauch (1828–1888), Grand Burgher, Lord of Wellingsbüttel and cavalry lieutenant in the Hamburg Citizen Militia
 August Jauch (1861–1930), delegate of the grand burghers to the Hamburg parliament
 Hans Jauch (1883–1985), German colonel and Freikorps-leader
 Walter Jauch (1888–1976), founder of Aon Jauch & Hübener
 Günther Jauch (born 1956), German television host and producer

Jencquel

Justus

 Bartholomäus Justus (1540–1607), Hamburg notary public at St Petri district of Hamburg 
 Christoph Justus (1579–1652), Merchant in the Gröninger Straße, St Katharinen district of Hamburg

 Friederich Justus (1683–1757), Merchant in Neukalen and Mayor of Neukalen in the state of Mecklenburg, Founder of the Tobacco business est in 1723
 Friederich Justus (1722–1784), Merchant and Tobacco Manufacturer in the Gröninger Straße, Grand Burgher, Oberalter St Katharinen, top 5 ranking member of the Hamburg Parliament, President of the Hamburg Chamber of Commerce
 Joachim Christian Justus (1732–1802), Merchant and Tobacco Manufacturer in Hamburg and in Riga
 Georg Heinrich Justus (1761–1803), Merchant and Tobacco Manufacturer in the Gröninger Straße
 Friederich Justus (1797–1852), Merchant and Tobacco Manufacturer in the Gröninger Straße, Consul General of the Grand Duchy of Tuscany in Hamburg
 Heinrich Wilhelm Justus (1800–1839), Merchant and Tobacco Manufacturer in the Gröninger Straße
 Heinrich Eduard Justus (1828–1899), Owner of the first united steam shipping fleet on the Alster and the dockyard at Leinpfad Hamburg, Member of Hamburg Parliament 
 Johannes Wilheln Justus (1857–1943), Partner of the Latin America Trading Company "Riensch & Held" est 1845 in Hamburg and Mexico, Co-Founding Member of the Hamburg Golf Club in 1905 
 Heinz Heinrich Ernst Justus (1894–1982), Partner of the Latin America Trading Company "Riensch & Held", member of the plenum of Hamburg Chamber of Commerce, First Lieutenant WWI, EK I and EK II

Kellinghusen
 Heinrich Kellinghusen (1796–1879), Hamburg merchant and first mayor

Lorenz-Meyer

Mann

 Thomas Johann Heinrich Mann (1840–1891), senator of Lübeck; fictionalized "Thomas Buddenbrook" in Buddenbrooks
 Heinrich Mann (1871–1950), German novelist
 Thomas Mann (1875–1955), German novelist
 Erika Mann (1905–1969), German actress and writer
 Klaus Mann (1906–1949), German novelist
 Golo Mann (1909–1994), German historian

Merck (Hamburg branch of the Merck family)
 Heinrich Johann Merck (1770–1853), Hamburg senator
 Carl Merck (1809–1880), Hamburg Syndicus (privy councillor)
 Baron Ernst Merck (1811–1863), Hamburg merchant and cavalry chief of the Hamburg Citizen Militia

Moller (vom Baum)
 Barthold (Bartholomeus) Moller (1605–1667), mayor of Hamburg

Mutzenbecher
 Matthias Mutzenbecher (1653–1735), senator of Hamburg
 Johann Baptista Mutzenbecher (1691–1759), privy councillor of Hamburg

Nölting

Overbeck
 Johann Daniel Overbeck (1715–1802), theologian and dean of the Katharineum
 Christian Adolph Overbeck (1755–1821), mayor of Lübeck, novelist
 Christian Gerhard Overbeck (1784–1846), judge at the High Court of Appeal of the four free cities
 Johann Friedrich Overbeck (1789–1869), German painter, head of the Nazarene movement
 Christian Theodor Overbeck (1818–1880), senator of Lübeck
 Johannes Overbeck (1826–1895), German archaeologist

Petersen
 Carl Friedrich Petersen (1809–1892), mayor of Hamburg
 Carl Wilhelm Petersen (1868–1933), mayor of Hamburg
 Rudolf Petersen (1878–1962), mayor of Hamburg

Schlüter

Schröder
 Christian Matthias Schröder (1742–1821), mayor of Hamburg
 Christian Mathias Schröder (1778–1860), Hamburg senator
 Johann Heinrich Schröder (Freiherr John Henry Schröder) (1784–1883), Baron, Hamburg banker
 Carl August Schröder (1821–1902), Hamburg judge and member of parliament
 Carl August Schröder (1855–1945), mayor of Hamburg

Schuback
 Nicolaus Schuback (1700–1783), mayor of Hamburg

Siemers
 Edmund Siemers (1840–1918), Hamburg ship-owner
 Kurt Siemers (1873–1944), Hamburg ship-owner and banker
 Kurt Hartwig Siemers (1907–1988), Hamburg banker

Sieveking
 Georg Heinrich Sieveking (1751–1791), Hamburg merchant
 Sir Edward Henry Sieveking (1816–1904), physician
 Kurt Sieveking (1897–1986), mayor of Hamburg

Sillem
 Garlieb Sillem (1717–1732), mayor of Hamburg

Sloman
 Robert Miles Sloman (1783–1867), Hamburg ship-owner
 Henry Brarens Sloman (1848–1931), Hamburg ship-owner

Stern

Tesdorpf
 Peter Hinrich Tesdorpf (1648–1723), mayor of Lübeck
 Peter Hinrich Tesdorpf (1751–1832), mayor of Lübeck
 Johann Matthaeus Tesdorpf (1749–1824), mayor of Lübeck
 Adolph Tesdorpf (1811–1887), Hamburg senator
 Ebba Tesdorpf (1851–1920), Hamburg illustrator and watercolourist

See also
 List of mayors of Hamburg – Hanseatics being those since approximately 1650, Hanseatic families are normally those of the mayors until 1918.
  – Residential avenue in Hamburg, emblematic of a Hanseatic lifestyle.
 Patrician (post-Roman Europe)
 Aristocracy (class)
 Gentry
 Burgess (title)
 
Bourgeois of Brussels

Literature 

 Lu Seegers (2016): Hanseaten: Mythos und Realität des ehrbaren Kaufmanns seit dem 19. Jahrhundert. (Hanseatic class: myth and reality of the honorable merchant since the 19th century). in: Katalog des Europäischen Hansemuseums, Lübeck 2016, p. 106-110.

 Lu Seegers (2014): Hanseaten und das Hanseatische in Diktatur und Demokratie: Politisch-ideologische Zuschreibungen und Praxen (Hanseatic League and the Hanseatic in Dictatorship and Democracy: Political-Ideological Attributions and Practices). in: Zeitgeschichte in Hamburg 2014, hrsg. von der Forschungsstelle für Zeitgeschichte in Hamburg (FZH), Hamburg 2015, p. 71-83.

References

Hanseatic Cities
History of Bremen (city)
Lübeck
History of Hamburg
Social history of the Holy Roman Empire
Social class in Germany
Social class subcultures
 
Republicanism in Europe